Oonops pulcher is a tiny spider (males about 1½ mm, females 2 mm). Its six eyes are located closely together, giving the impression of only one eye. The spider is of a bleak light red, with a reddish to whitish abdomen, and found out of doors in bird nests, under stones and under tree bark, also in webs of Amaurobius and Coelotes (two spider genera from the family Amaurobiidae). Only two eggs are laid into a flat eggsac.

When moving it keep its two front legs stretched, moves very slowly a few steps and then accelerates.

It is very similar to the closely related O. domesticus, but has four tibial spine pairs instead of five. O. domesticus is only found in buildings.

Oonops pulcher has been identified from Europe to Ukraine, North Africa, and Tasmania, where it was introduced by man.

The subspecies Oonops pulcher hispanicus (Dalmas, 1916) is found in Spain.

Name
The species name pulcher is Latin for "beautiful", referring to the oval eyes.

References
 
 

Oonopidae
Spiders of Europe
Spiders of Africa
Invertebrates of North Africa
Spiders described in 1835
Taxa named by Robert Templeton